The 2018–19 season was Sunderland's 140th season in existence, and their first season in the third tier of English football since 1987, after relegation from the Championship the previous season. Along with competing in League One, the club also participated in the FA Cup and EFL Cup as well as the EFL Trophy. The season covered the period from 1 July 2018 to 30 June 2019.

First team squad

Pre-season friendlies
As of 18 July 2018, Sunderland have announced five pre-season friendlies against Darlington, Hartlepool United, Grimsby Town, St Mirren, and Middlesbrough.

Competitions

League One

League table

Result summary

Results by matchday

Matches

The fixtures for the 2018–19 season were released on 21 June 2018.

League One play-offs

FA Cup

On 22 October 2018, the draw for the first round was made in Hitchin. The draw for the second round was made live on BBC and BT by Mark Schwarzer and Glenn Murray on 12 November.

EFL Cup

On 15 June 2018, the draw for the first round was made in Vietnam.

EFL Trophy

On 13 July 2018, the initial group stage draw bar the U21 invited clubs was announced. The draw for the second round was made live on Talksport by Leon Britton and Steve Claridge on 16 November. On 8 December, the third round draw was drawn by Alan McInally and Matt Le Tissier on Soccer Saturday. The Quarter-final draw was made conducted on Sky Sports by Don Goodman and Thomas Frank on 10 January 2019. The draw for the semi-finals took place on 25 January live on Talksport.

Group A

Knockout stage

Squad statistics

Top scorers

Appearances and goals
 

|-
|colspan="14"|Players who have played for Sunderland this season but are currently out on loan:

|-
|colspan="14"|Players who have played for Sunderland this season but have left the club:

|-
|}

Disciplinary record

Transfers

Transfers in

Loans in

Transfers out

Loans out

See also
Sunderland 'Til I Die

References

Sunderland
Sunderland A.F.C. seasons